James Mark is an American-born conductor, clarinetist, saxophonist, arranger and educator based in Canada. He is Conductor of Musica Viva New Brunswick, Conductor Emeritus of the Prince Edward Island Symphony Orchestra and appears frequently as guest conductor with a number of orchestras and wind ensembles. Additionally, he was Principal Conductor of the New Brunswick Youth Orchestra from 1982–83 and again from 1994–2010, making it "one of the best youth orchestras in Canada". James Mark is Professor Emeritus of Music at Mount Allison University, where he taught clarinet, saxophone, instrumental conducting and secondary music education for more than twenty years. He was also director of the Mount Allison Symphonic Band and mentor to the CMEA award-winning Saxville Quartet. He continues to be in demand as an adjudicator and clinician. He performs regularly on clarinet and saxophone and has appeared across Canada and the United States with numerous regional, national and international broadcasts. Mark holds the Bachelor of Music from the Eastman School of Music (1961), the Master of Music from Hartt College of Music (1969) and the Doctor of Musical Arts from the University of Michigan (1978). He is also an Associate of the Royal College of Music, London, where he was twice awarded (1962, 1963) the Arthur Somervell Prize for Wind Instruments by Queen Elizabeth The Queen Mother. Mark has been a member of the U.S. Air Force Band in Washington, D.C. and taught music at the high school level in Massachusetts.

He and his wife, pianist and harpsichordist Penelope Mark, recorded an album, Canadian Music for Clarinet, which was nominated for an East Coast Music Award. The New Brunswick Youth Orchestra also recorded three albums under his direction, namely Première, Virtuoso Italia 2005 (recorded in Italy), and Forbidden City Tour (recorded in China), which won an East Coast Music Award for Best Classical Recording in 2008. Mark also conducted the NBYO for their performances at Carnegie Hall (NY, NY, USA), Auditorio Paganini (Parma, Italy) and for their performance before Queen Elizabeth II.

Discography

Albums

See also
New Brunswick Youth Orchestra

External links
Biography of Dr. James Mark on J Mark Music Website
Profile of Dr. James Mark on PEI Symphony Website 
Mount Allison University, Department of Music – Recordings – Canadian Music for Clarinet

References
Mount Allison University, May 03, 2006 – Mount A’s “Lunch and Learn” series hits a musical note in Moncton, May 11
PEI Symphony Orchestra – Dr. James Mark
CBC, December 10, 1999: Island musicians collect 12 ECMA nominations

Male conductors (music)
Living people
Year of birth missing (living people)
University of Michigan School of Music, Theatre & Dance alumni
Eastman School of Music alumni
University of Hartford Hartt School alumni
Alumni of the Royal College of Music
Academic staff of Mount Allison University
Canadian clarinetists
American clarinetists
Bass clarinetists
Canadian saxophonists
Male saxophonists
Canadian music arrangers
21st-century American saxophonists
21st-century Canadian conductors (music)
21st-century clarinetists
21st-century American male musicians